Senator Novstrup may refer to:

Al Novstrup (born 1954), South Dakota State Senate
David Novstrup (born 1983), South Dakota State Senate